CMA CGM S.A. is a French container transportation and shipping company. It is the world’s 3rd largest container shipping company, using 257 shipping routes between 420 ports in 160 countries. Its headquarters are in Marseille, France The name is an acronym of two predecessor companies, Compagnie Maritime d'Affrètement (CMA) and Compagnie Générale Maritime (CGM), which translate as "Maritime Freighting Company" and "General Maritime Company".

History

The history of CMA CGM can be traced back to the middle of the 19th century, when two major French shipping lines were created, respectively Messageries Maritimes (MM) in 1851 and Compagnie Générale Maritime (CGM) in 1855, soon renamed Compagnie Générale Transatlantique in 1861. Both companies were created partly with the backing of the French State, through the award of mail contracts to various destinations, French colonies and overseas territories as well as foreign countries. After the two World Wars, the two companies became "State owned corporations of the competitive sector" ("Entreprise publique du secteur concurrentiel"), i.e. companies that, while owned by the State, were run as private for-profit businesses operating in competitive markets. The French government, under President Valéry Giscard d'Estaing and Prime Minister Jacques Chirac, progressively merged the two companies between 1974 and 1977 to form Compagnie Générale Maritime, which was still owned by the French government and still run as a competitive business, although sometimes subject to political pressure, for instance on the selection of shipyards to build new ships.

Compagnie Générale Maritime (CGM) operated as such from 1974 to 1996 when it was privatized by the French state under President Chirac and Prime Minister Alain Juppé. During these 22 years it operated freight and container liner services in various global trade lanes, as well as a fleet of dry bulk ships, and a few large oil tankers and Liquefied Natural Gas (LNG) tankers, with headquarters located in Paris' western suburbs, first in Paris-La Defense, then in close by Suresnes.

The CGM liner services, mostly containerized but also operating a significant fleet of "Con-Ro" vessels able to load roll-on/roll-off cargoes, were re-structured from the two parent companies' main trade lanes, i.e. Western trade lanes (Americas) for Compagnie Générale Transatlantique (CGT) and Eastern trade lanes (Asia, East Africa, Pacific, plus Eastern South America) for Messageries Maritimes (MM). After merger and re-structure, CGM's liner services were managed in four distinct Trade Divisions, North America & Far East (AMNEO, for Amérique du Nord & Extrême Orient) which also managed the bulk and tanker fleets, South America & Caribbean (AMLAT), Pacific & Indian Ocean (PACOI) and Short Sea Trades (Cabotage).

Separately, Jacques Saadé had created CMA in 1978 as an intra-Mediterranean liner service operator, based in Marseille. In 1996, CGM was privatized and sold to Compagnie Maritime d'Affrètement (CMA) to form CMA CGM.

In 1998 the combined company purchased Australian National Lines (ANL).

In September 2005 CMA CGM acquired its French rival Delmas based in Le Havre from the Bolloré Group for €600 million. The acquisition was completed in early January 5, 2006. The resulting corporation became the third largest container company in the world behind the Danish A.P. Moller-Maersk Group and the Swiss Mediterranean Shipping Company S.A.

In May 2007, a consortium represented by CMA-CGM completed its acquisition of Compagnie Maroccaine de Navigation (Comanav) for a sum of €200 million.

In July 2007, CMA-CGM acquired Cheng Lie Navigation Corp. (CNC Line), Intra-Asia container line based in Taiwan.

In 2014, CMA CGM signs the Ocean Three agreements. The group strengthens its offer by signing major agreements on the biggest worldwide maritime trades with CSCL and UASC.

In April 2015, the group acquired a strategic stake in LCL Logistix, a logistics leader in India, via its subsidiary CMA CGM LOG.

In December 2015, CMA CGM Benjamin Franklin called at the Port of Los Angeles and thus became the largest vessel ever to call the United States.

In July 2016 CMA CGM finalized its acquisition of Singapore-based NOL (Neptune Orient Lines) and its container line APL (American President Lines) after an all-cash offer of US$2.4 billion. The takeover is CMA CGM's largest acquisition and the purchase added 12 percent market share to the CMA CGM group. The Singapore Exchange Securities Trading suspended trading of NOL shares at the end of the offer.

In June 2017, CMA CGM acquire Mercosul Line, a Brazilian shipping company specialized in multimodal door-to-door container transportation and logistics.

In October 2018, CMA CGM finalized the acquisition of Finland-based container-transportation and logistics company Containerships.

In April 2019, CMA CGM completed its public tender offer to acquire CEVA Logistics. With this acquisition, the CMA CGM Group becomes a global leader in transport and logistics, 110,000 people strong with more than $30,3 billion in revenue. CEVA operational center is transferred in Marseille, France, where is located the Head Office of the CMA CGM Group.

In February 2021, CMA CGM Group completes its logistics offer by creating a new division dedicated to air freight: CMA CGM Air Cargo. With its four Airbus A330-200F cargo aircraft, this airfreight division links Europe to North America. The first flight from Liège to Chicago marks the debut of commercial operations.

In September 2021, CMA CGM announced a partnership with fellow Breton-based operator Brittany Ferries. The partnership involves a €25 million investment, plus a CMA CGM representative joining Brittany Ferries' supervisory board.

In May 2022, CMA CGM, signed a strategic partnership with Air France–KLM Group to develop their air cargo capacities together. As part of the agreement CMA CGM may also acquire a stake of up to 9% in the Franco-Dutch airline group.

Subsidiaries
Maritime activities
 Australian National Line (ANL) (specializes in Australia, New Zealand, Oceania and Asia container transportation)
 Compagnie Maroccaine de Navigation (Comanav) (passenger ferry and container services from Morocco to Europe)
 Cheng Lie Navigation Corp. (CNC Line) (specializes in Intra-Asia container transportation)
Mercosul Line (specializes on the East Coast of South America container transportation)
 Containerships (specializes in Intra-European container transportation)
 American President Lines (APL) (Singapore-based container line)
Terminal activities
 Terminal Link - container terminals developer and operator, ranked N°12 worldwide
 CMA Terminals Holding

Intermodal activities and logistics
 Progeco (container: sales, leasing & repairing)
 CMA CGM Logistics
 Rail Link (multimodal rail-bound transport solutions)
 River Shuttle Containers (Rhône – Saône axis containerised river transportation)

Support activities
 CMA Ships (a wholly-owned subsidiary managing all fleet-related operations)
Air services
CMA CGM Air Cargo, active since February 2021, operates a total of 4 Airbus A330-200Fs and 2 Boeing 777Fs.

Joint ventures
 CMA Systems

CMA CGM Corporate Foundation for Children 
Established in 2005, the CMA CGM Corporate Foundation for Children seeks to improve the overall well-being of children around the world. It defined three targets:
 To improve the everyday lives of children who are physically and mentally ill;
 To promote equitable opportunities for children coming from underprivileged backgrounds; and
 To encourage the personal development of children with disabilities.

Fleet

In 2021, CMA CGM's fleet included:
 566 vessels
 4,500,000 container TEUs
 600,000 reefer container TEUs

The fleet has 200 maritime services and calls at more than 420 ports in 160 countries. There are 521 commercial ports in the world at the moment.

Some emblematic group's vessels are:
  (16,020 TEUs) was christened in June 2013 by the French President François Hollande. At that time, this vessel sailing under the French flag was the world's biggest container ship.
  (16,020 TEUs)
  (16,020 TEUs)
  (18,000 TEUs)
  (18,000 TEUs)
  (18,000 TEUs)
  (18,000 TEUs)
  (18,000 TEUs)
  (18,000 TEUs)
  (20,800 TEUs); flagship and largest French-flagged container ship as of 2018

Air fleet

Accidents and incidents 

On April 4, 2008, pirates seized the CMA CGM luxury cruise ship Le Ponant off the coast of Somalia.

CMA CGM and its affiliates have been implicated in various arms-shipping incidents. 
 November 2009: South Africa seized arms traveling from North Korea by way of China. The seizure amounted to two containers filled with tank parts and other military equipment from North Korea, which included "gun sights, tracks and other spare parts for T-54 and T-55 tanks and other war material valued at an estimated $750,000." The military equipment was concealed in containers lined with sacks of rice and shipping documents identified the cargo as spare parts for a "bulldozer". According to the report, the containers were originally loaded in Dalian, China onto CMA CGM Musca, a UK-flagged container ship. The shipment was reportedly destined for Pointe-Noire in the Republic of Congo.
 July 2009: The United Arab Emirates seized a shipment of weapons from North Korea destined for Iran. The shipment was made in violation of UN Security Council Resolution 1874, which bans all North Korean Arms exports. The weapons, which included RPGs, detonators, ammunition, and rocket propellant, were shipped by a Bahamian-flagged vessel of ANL Australia, a wholly owned subsidiary of CMA CGM. 
 October 2010: Nigerian authorities seized 13 shipping containers carrying illegal Iranian weaponry at Lagos' Apapa Port. The containers included 107 mm artillery rockets (Katyushas), explosives and rifle ammunition. The arms were to be shipped next to The Gambia, with the final destination of the cargo possibly the Gaza Strip. MV CMA CGM Everest originally picked up the containers from the Iranian port of Bandar Abbas. CMA CGM said it was the victim of a false cargo declaration, claiming the weapons were shipped in packages labeled as "glass wool and pallets of stone" and that the Iranian shipper "does not appear on any forbidden persons listing". 
 March 2011: Israeli forces intercepted the vessel Victoria in international waters in the Mediterranean Sea, stating that it was carrying weapons by Iran via Syria. According to Israeli officials, the arms shipments included "roughly 2,500 mortar shells, nearly 75,000 bullets and six C-704 anti-ship missiles". Israel said the ultimate destination of the cargo was for the Hamas-controlled Gaza Strip. CMA CGM, which chartered the vessel, stated, "The ship's manifests do not show any cargo in contravention [of] international regulations, and we do not have any more information at this stage."

As a result of CMA CGM's involvement in Iranian weapons smuggling, US congressmen have called on CMA CGM to be investigated and urged the US Treasury Department to consider levying sanctions against the shipper. The company has since implemented tighter procedures for accepting shipments bound for Iran, including scanning all containers destined for the country. CMA CGM has also ceased exporting from Iranian ports since November 2011.

CMA CGM Centaurus 
On 4 May 2017, the container ship CMA CGM Centaurus made heavy contact with the quay and two shore cranes while under pilotage during its arrival at Jebel Ali, United Arab Emirates. The accident resulted in the collapse of a shore crane and 10 injuries to shore personnel.

CMA CGM Washington 
On 20 January 2018, the container ship CMA CGM Washington was on-route to Los Angeles, US, from Xiamen, China, when it experienced heavy waves in the North Pacific Ocean. The crew discovered that three bays, 54, 58 and 18, collapsed, which led to the loss of 137 containers and damage of another 85.

CMA CGM Norma 
On 24 December 2018, the container ship CMA CGM Norma was involved in a collision with the China-flagged general cargo ship Yusheng366 in the waters south of Hong Kong. All the crew from Yusheng366 were rescued as they abandoned ship before she sank, while CMA CGM Norma suffered minor damages.

See also
 List of largest container shipping companies

References

External links

 CMA-CGM
CMA-CGM vessels list

Companies based in Marseille
French brands
Shipping companies of France
Compagnie Générale Transatlantique
Container shipping companies
Transport companies established in 1978
1978 establishments in France
1996 mergers and acquisitions